Louisiana Highway 59 (LA 59) is a state highway located in St. Tammany Parish, Louisiana.  It runs  in a north–south direction from U.S. Highway 190 (US 190) in Mandeville to LA 21 north of Abita Springs.

The highway is the most direct connection between the city of Mandeville and the town of Abita Springs.  It also connects both places with Interstate 12 (I-12) roughly halfway between the two.  North of Abita Springs, LA 59 intersects LA 21, connecting to Bogalusa and points along the Louisiana–Mississippi state line.

Route description
From the south, LA 59 begins at an intersection with US 190 (Florida Street) along the northern edge of the city of Mandeville. US 190 is the main highway through town and connects to the Lake Pontchartrain Causeway, a toll bridge to New Orleans. LA 59 proceeds northeast on Girod Street as an undivided two-lane highway with a center turning lane. Though technically outside the Mandeville city limits, the area continues the city's grid pattern and residential development ensconced within a pine forest.

LA 59 continues northeast through an area of mixed rural and newer residential development and turns due north  later.  After passing the entrances to several sprawling school campuses, LA 59 goes through a diamond interchange with I-12, which connects to Hammond on the west and Slidell on the east.  North of I-12, the surroundings change from residential to an area featuring several small industrial parks as well as the St. Tammany Parish Administrative Complex.  After , LA 59 makes a curve while crossing the Tammany Trace bike trail, located along a former railroad right-of-way.  The highway resumes its regular course and,  later, enters the small town of Abita Springs at an intersection with Harrison Avenue, a local road.

LA 59 continues north, narrowing slightly as its center lane is discontinued.  The surroundings become largely residential once again, though often still hidden within the dense pine trees.   into Abita Springs, LA 59 makes a sharp curve to the east into the center of town, where it becomes known as Level Street.  Shortly afterward, the highway reaches the town's main junction, a roundabout at which LA 59 intersects and begins a concurrency with LA 36.  At this roundabout, eastbound LA 36 heads toward Hickory and Pearl River; Level Street continues east as a local road; and LA 36 turns north with LA 59 onto Maple Street.  One block later is an intersection with LA 435 (Main Street), which heads northeast toward Talisheek.

Upon exiting the populated portion of Abita Springs, LA 36 and LA 59 curve to the northwest and cross a small bridge over the Abita River.  The two highways split shortly afterward as LA 36 continues west toward Covington while LA 59 turns north onto Range Line Road.  LA 59 officially crosses the town limits after  and continues north through a thick pine forest with scattered residential development.  After , the route ends at an intersection with LA 21 (Military Road).  LA 21 heads southwest into Covington and northeast through Bush en route to Bogalusa.

Route classification and data
LA 59 is classified by the Louisiana Department of Transportation and Development (La DOTD) as an urban minor arterial from the southern terminus to the second junction with LA 36 in Abita Springs. It then becomes an urban collector from there to Lowe Davis Road, where it changes to a rural minor collector for the remainder of its route. Average daily traffic volume in 2013 is reported as 17,600 vehicles between Mandeville and Abita Springs, slightly decreasing to 16,000 within Abita Springs. The section north of Abita Springs has a much lower count of 5,300 vehicles.

History
In the original Louisiana Highway system in use between 1921 and 1955, the modern LA 59 was part of two separate state highways.  State Route 114 followed the route from the southern terminus to Abita Springs, where it turned east and continued along the present LA 36 toward Hickory.  The remainder of LA 59 north of Abita Springs was formerly State Route 190.  Both routes were designated by an act of the state legislature in 1928 and existed until the 1955 Louisiana Highway renumbering.

LA 59 was created in the 1955 renumbering following the north–south portion of former State Route 114 combined with the entirety of former State Route 190.

The route of LA 59 has remained the same to the present day.  In August 2007, the main junction in Abita Springs, previously governed by a traffic signal, was converted to a roundabout by the state highway department.  The roundabout, only the second to be constructed on a state highway in Louisiana, was designed to reduce traffic congestion at the busy intersection and improve the flow of truck traffic.

Future
Under this plan of "right-sizing" the state highway system, the entire route of LA 59 (with the exception of the short concurrency with LA 36) is proposed for deletion as it no longer meets a significant interurban travel function.

Major intersections

See also

References

External links

Maps / GIS Data Homepage, Louisiana Department of Transportation and Development

0059
Transportation in St. Tammany Parish, Louisiana